Cammo is a northwestern suburb of Edinburgh, the capital of Scotland.

Etymology

The name is Celtic in origin, but could have originated either in Scottish Gaelic or Cumbric. In the former case it would be an adjectival form of Gaelic cambas 'bay. creek'; in the latter it would be from Brittonic *cambāco-, an adjectival form of *camas 'bend in river, bay'. This element would probably refer to a bend of the river in this context, as Cammo is inland.

Cammo House

To the west of the housing area there is the former estate of Cammo House. The house was built for John Menzies in 1693, and the surrounding parkland was laid out between 1710-26 by Sir John Clerk of Penicuik (1676–1755). In 1741, the estate passed to the Watsons of Saughton at which time it was called New Saughton. The house was bequeathed to the National Trust for Scotland in 1975 but, in 1977, the house was torched twice by vandals. The house was considered unsafe and was reduced to its external ground floor walls. In 1980 the City of Edinburgh Council was gifted the estate and declared it a Wilderness Park. The Council now maintain the grounds and operates a ranger service. Cammo is thought to have been the inspiration for the "House of Shaws" in Robert Louis Stevenson's novel Kidnapped.

Cammo Tower is a 19th-century water tower for Cammo House. Other remains include the ruined stable block, a formal canal, a bridge, and the lodge which now houses a small visitor centre.  The grounds are now widely used by people for walking in, although other sections remain as farmland, used for cattle grazing.

Famous Residents

Alexander Charles Stephen zoologist lived at 17 Cammo Crescent

References
 Baillie, Simon J. The private world of Cammo (1995)
 Bell, Raymond MacKean Literary Corstorphine: A reader's guide to West Edinburgh, Leamington Books, Edinburgh 2017
 Cant, Michael, Villages of Edinburgh volumes 1 & 2, John Donald Publishers Ltd., Edinburgh, 1986-1987.  & 
 Cowper, Alexandra Stewart Corstorphine Village, 1891 (1973), Edinburgh University Extra-Mural Association 
 Dey, W.G. Corstorphine: A Pictorial History of a Midlothian Village (1990), Mainstream Publishing 
 Harris, Stuart (1996). The Place Names of Edinburgh. Edinburgh: Gordon Wright Publishing. p. 144. .
 Sherman, Robin Old Murrayfield and Corstorphine (2003)

External links
Cammo Estate Park
Friends of Cammo

Areas of Edinburgh
Inventory of Gardens and Designed Landscapes
Parks and commons in Edinburgh